John Mortimore is the name of:
 John Mortimore (cricketer) (1933–2014) English cricketer
 John Mortimore (footballer) (1934–2021) English football player and manager

See also
John Mortimer (disambiguation)